Calcaneal branches may refer to:

 Lateral calcaneal branches of sural nerve
 Medial calcaneal branches of the tibial nerve